Poster Girl is a 2010 documentary film about an American soldier's experience with posttraumatic stress disorder after returning from the Iraq War. The film showed at the 37th Telluride Film Festival on September 3, 2010. It was named as a nominee for the Academy Award for Best Documentary (Short Subject) at the 83rd Academy Awards on January 25, 2011 but lost to Strangers No More.

The documentary short film is a production of Portrayal Films and was conceived and produced by Mitchell Block and directed and photographed by Sara Nesson.

References

External links
 
 

2010 films
American documentary films
2010 documentary films
Documentary films about veterans
Documentary films about the Iraq War
Documentary films about post-traumatic stress disorder
Women in the Iraq War
Women in the United States Army
Documentary films about women in war
2010s English-language films
2010s American films